Zygodontomys brevicauda, also known as the short-tailed zygodont, short-tailed cane mouse, or common cane mouse, is a species of rodent in the genus Zygodontomys of tribe Oryzomyini.

Distribution
It occurs from Costa Rica via Panama, Colombia and Venezuela into Guyana, Suriname, French Guiana and northern Brazil, including Trinidad and Tobago in the Caribbean.

subspecies
It includes three subspecies: 
Zygodontomys brevicauda brevicauda
Zygodontomys brevicauda cherriei
Zygodontomys brevicauda microtinus.

Diseases
Many Zygodontomys brevicauda serve as viral reservoirs, causing illnesses such as Venezuelan hemorrhagic fever.

References

Literature cited
Duff, A. and Lawson, A. 2004. Mammals of the World: A checklist. Yale University Press, 312 pp. 
Musser, G.G. and Carleton, M.D. 2005. Superfamily Muroidea. Pp. 894–1531 in Wilson, D.E. and Reeder, D.M. (eds.). Mammal Species of the World: a taxonomic and geographic reference. 3rd ed. Baltimore: The Johns Hopkins University Press, 2 vols., 2142 pp. 

Zygodontomys
Mammals of Colombia
Rodents of Central America
Mammals of Trinidad and Tobago
Mammals of the Caribbean
Mammals described in 1893
Taxa named by Joel Asaph Allen
Taxa named by Frank Chapman (ornithologist)